Thomas Novi Handriawan (born November 4, 1986) is an Indonesian footballer who currently plays for PSMS Medan in the Indonesia Super League.

Club statistics

References

External links

1986 births
Association football defenders
Living people
Indonesian footballers
Liga 1 (Indonesia) players
PSMS Medan players
Indonesian Premier Division players
PSDS Deli Serdang players
Semen Padang F.C. players
People from Deli Serdang Regency
Sportspeople from North Sumatra